Ghenadie Orbu (born 8 July 1982, Chișinău) is a Moldovan professional footballer who currently plays for Victoria Bardar.

External links
 
 
 
 
 

1982 births
Living people
Moldovan footballers
Moldova international footballers
Moldovan Super Liga players
FC Dacia Chișinău players
FC Codru Lozova players
FC Dinamo-Auto Tiraspol players
Speranța Nisporeni players
FC Victoria Bardar players
Association football forwards